Devprasad John Ganawa, S.V.D. (born 8 December 1951), is an Indian Roman Catholic bishop. He is currently Bishop of Udaipur.

Early life 
Ganawa was born in Panchkui, Madhya Pradesh, India. He completed his studies at the Seminary of St. Thomas and at the Jnana-Deepa Vidyapeeth.

Priesthood 
On 27 October 1982, Ganawa was ordained a priest for the Society of the Divine Word.

Episcopate 
Ganawa was appointed bishop of the Roman Catholic Diocese of Jhabua on 11 May 2009 by Pope Benedict XVI and consecrated on 16 June 2009 by Leo Cornelio. On 21 December 2012, he was appointed bishop of the Roman Catholic Diocese of Udaipur by Pope Benedict XVI. He also served as apostolic administrator of Jhabua from 21 December 2012 to 10 October 2015. His episcopal motto is THE JOY OF HOPE.

See also 
 List of Catholic bishops of India

References 

1951 births
Living people
Indian Roman Catholic bishops
Divine Word Missionaries Order
21st-century Roman Catholic bishops in India